The 2011 European Eventing Championship was held from August 25 to August 28, 2011 in Luhmühlen, borough of the Samtgemeinde Salzhausen in Lower Saxony, Germany.

In was the 30th edition of the European Eventing Championships, first time held 1953 at Badminton House.

Organization

Before the event 
At the 2008 FEI-General Assembly in Buenos Aires, Argentina, Germany was chosen as the country to host the 2011 European Eventing Championship. Luhmühlen, location of the Luhmühlen Horse Trials, was chosen as the location for the event.

Luhmühlen had held the European Eventing Championships already in the years 1975, 1979, 1987 and 1999.

Event and location 
The European Eventing Championship was opened at the afternoon of Wednesday (August 24, 2011) with the opening ceremony “Ritte des Jahrhunderts” (rides of the century). Also on Wednesday the first horse inspection was held. The sport at the Championship had started on Thursday. On Sunday (August 28, 2011) the event ended with the medal ceremony.

The event was held at the eventing course in the “Westergellerser Heide” near Luhmühlen. Before the 2011 Luhmühlen Horse Trials, two months before the European Championship, the show ground of the course was completely rebuilt.

The main sponsor of the Championship was HSBC. Patroness of the event was German federal minister Ursula von der Leyen.

Competitions

General 
Unmodified since the first European Eventing Championship (with the exception of the European Championship 1997) two medal rankings are held at the Championships: the individual and the team medal ranking.

Since 2005 the European Championships are held as long format three-day event in the new format without steeplechase: dressage, cross country and show jumping.

Eleven teams and also individual riders started at the 2011 European Eventing Championship, in total 70 riders with their horses started. All teams could start with four riders, also each nation could start two extra individual riders. Germany as host nation could start with one team and eight extra individual riders.

Timetable 
The first part of the competition was the dressage phase, held on Wednesday and on Friday (August 25 and 26, 2011). Before the riders participate at the Championship, a test rider ("guinea pig") rides to test the systems. This task is performed by German eventing rider Anna Siemer with her horse Charlott.

The second part was the cross country phase on Saturday. The jumping phase, last part of the event, was held on Sunday. The competition was held each day from morning to afternoon.

Results

Provisional result after dressage 
In the dressage phase Germany was the most successful team. The German team get a team result of 98.70 penalty points - the best dressage result in eventing history.

An important contribution to this result came from  Ingrid Klimke with FRH Butts Abraxxas. With a dressage result of 80.00% (annualised 30.00 penalty points) Klimke get her best ever eventing dressage result. With this result she was the leader of the individual ranking after dressage.

Individual ranking:

Team ranking:

Provisional result after cross country 
The cross country day was rainy. The course, built by Mark Phillips was a challenging, but solvable task for the riders: two riders retired at the cross country day, eleven riders was eliminated at the cross country. The Belgian team consisted only of two riders after the cross country and was so no more complete team.

After cross country Germany was still in the lead - despite of the fall of the team rider Andreas Dibowski.

Individual ranking:

Team ranking:

Final result 
After the cross country phase, on Sunday morning, the second horse inspection was held. Here the horses of a Spanish and of a Polish team rider were deemed "not fit to compete", so they were eliminated. Because of this the Polish team now consisted only of two riders - not a complete team.

Much changes in the individual ranking result from the show jumping phase. Again the German team was successful, team riders Sandra Auffarth and Michael Jung was clear in the show jumping course. As last rider in the competition Ingrid Klimke start in show jumping phase. Her horse Abraxxas, who had often faults in show jumping in the past - had six time knocked a rail down in this show jumping course. Klimke, now eleventh in the final ranking, comment time with the words "Sechs um - so schlecht ist er noch nie gesprungen" (six down - so bad he had never jumped before).

German rider Michael Jung benefited from this. He hold his result form the dressage phase the whole competition, so he won the individual gold medal. Jung is now the third (after Virginia Leng and Zara Phillips) who is the current world and European eventing champion at the same time. The German team was because of the large gap of penalty points also after the show jumping phase in the lead. So Germany win the 2011 European Eventing team gold medal.

Rank two and three in the final individual ranking are also German eventing riders: young Sandra Auffarth won at their first senior championship individual silver. Bronze was won by Frank Ostholt - he benefited by a refusal of the horse of his wife Sara Algotsson-Ostholt in show jumping.

The riders of the British team had all one obstacle fault in the show jumping phase, so they lost the second place in team ranking. The French team rider had all one faults here, so they won team silver.

Final individual result

Final team result

References

External links 

 web page of the 2011 European Eventing Championship

Eventing
Equestrian sports competitions in Germany
Eventing
2011 in German sport
International sports competitions hosted by Germany
European Eventing Championships